A Ninki Nanka is a legendary creature in West African folklore. Descriptions of the creature vary, but most contend that the animal is reptilian and possibly dragon-like.

According to tradition, the Ninki Nanka lives in the swamps of West Africa. The animal is said to be extremely large and very dangerous. It is said that when children get too confident and feel they can disobey their parents and go into the swamp they will be taken by the Ninki Nanka. This creature's tales were never recorded in any sort of non-modern text but the story of it has spread from tribe to tribe all over Africa. There is a song called "Ninki Nanka" on the album Casamance au clair de lune (1984) by the Senegalese music group Touré Kunda.

A group of "dragon hunters" from the Centre for Fortean Zoology (CFZ) went to Gambia in the summer of 2006 to investigate the Ninki Nanka and take testimony from those who have claimed to have seen the mythical creature. One interviewee who claimed to have had an encounter with a Ninki Nanka said it looked similar to an image of a Chinese dragon. The expedition, known as the "J. T. Downes Memorial Gambia Expedition 2006", received a fair amount of media attention, including coverage in a BBC Online article.

The ninki nanka has a similar description to the prehistoric tanystropheus, an archosauromorph that also has a crocodile-like body with a long neck.

Popular culture 
Ninki Nanka appeared in the 2016 fantasy novel, Kaytch by Joseph J. Grant.

Ninki Nanka are featured in the 2021 fantasy novel, Skin of the Sea by Natasha Bowen.

The Ninki Nanka is featured in one episode of Destination Truth's season 2.

References

External links
 BBC article

African folklore
West African legendary creatures